Countess Palatine Barbara of Zweibrücken-Neuburg (27 July 1559 – 5 March 1618) was a Countess Palatine of Zweibrücken by birth and by marriage Countess of Oettingen-Oettingen.

Life 
Barbara was born in Neuburg, a daughter of Duke and Count Palatine Wolfgang of Zweibrücken (1526–1569) from his marriage to Anna (1529–1591), the daughter of Philip I, Landgrave of Hesse.

On 7 November 1591, she married Count Gottfried of Oettingen-Oettingen (1554–1622) in Oettingen.  She was his second wife.  She brought a dowry of  into the marriage.  In 1594, Barbara gave birth to a daughter named Jakobina, but she died later that year.

Countess Barbara of Oettingen studied alchemy intensively and is considered one of the most important women who worked in this field.  She employed several alchemists and corresponded extensively on this subject with her nephew, Augustus, Count Palatine of Sulzbach.  Barbara also performed numerous experiments for Emperor Rudolf II in his residence in Prague, until she was expelled from the court.

Barbara died in Oettingen in 1618 was buried beside her husband in the Castle Church of St. Michael in Harburg.  Their tomb is decorated with a larger than life-size figure of the Countess at the side of her husband and his first wife.

Ancestry

References 

 Franz Joseph Mone: Anzeiger für Kunde der deutschen Vorzeit, Artistisch-literarische Anstalt des Germanischen Museums, 1863, S. 357

External links 
 http://geneall.net/D/per_page.php?id=54549

German countesses
German alchemists
House of Wittelsbach
1559 births
1618 deaths
16th-century German people
16th-century alchemists
17th-century alchemists
House of Oettingen-Oettingen
Daughters of monarchs